Marie Duchatel or Marie Du Chastel (1652 – 1692) was a Flemish painter and miniaturist.  She had an international career which brought her to work at the courts of Denmark and East Frisia. She married the Dutch painter Eglon van der Neer with him she also travelled abroad.  She is mainly known for her portraits.

Life
She was born in Brussels where she was baptized on 20 November 1652. She was the daughter of the Flemish painter François Duchatel and Jeanne Louys.  She was trained by her father.

Around 1675 she visited the Danish court, where she painted the pendant portraits of king Christian IV and his wife Charlotte.  Around the same time she visited East Frisia.  She was given a jewel by Christine Charlotte of Württemberg, a princess consort of George Christian, Prince of East Frisia. She was back in Brussels in 1677 where she likely met her future husband Eglon van der Neer. The couple got married around 1680. Their son Johannes van der Neer became a sculptor and was the founder of a dynasty of sculptors which flourished in Antwerp until the 19th century.

She accompanied her husband to Düsseldorf where he was commissioned to portray the princess Maria Anna of Neuburg. She may have assisted him with the portrait. In 1691 she was in Düsseldorf and Neuberg acting in matters for the Spanish Crown.

In his biography of her husband, Weyerman mentioned that he lived in an apartment located underneath hers in "the St. Joseph boarding house in the Keyserstraat in Antwerp". She painted daily and lived apart from her husband.

Work
She is known for miniature portraits.   Weyerman commented on her work that she could paint better than she drew.

Gallery

References

External links
 

1652 births
1692 deaths
Flemish Baroque painters
Flemish portrait painters
17th-century women artists
Artists from Brussels
Flemish women painters
Painters from Brussels